The Aston Martin AMR22 is a Formula One racing car designed and developed by the Aston Martin F1 team to compete in the 2022 Formula One World Championship.

Drivers
For 2022, Sebastian Vettel and Lance Stroll were both retained as race team drivers.  Nico Hülkenberg was announced as reserve driver.

Ordinarily, Vettel names his Formula One cars. However, with the AMR22 this is not the case.

Design and development
The AMR22 is the first car that has been overseen by new team principal, Mike Krack formerly of BMW Motorsport who replaced Otmar Szafnauer who joined Alpine.  Dan Fallows joined the development team in April 2022, leaving Red Bull Racing to become Aston Martin's technical director.  The AMR22 was first fired up on 4 February ahead of a launch on 10 February at the Aston Martin headquarters in Gaydon, United Kingdom. The following day, drivers Sebastian Vettel and Lance Stroll completed a shakedown at Silverstone Circuit.

Upon launch, it was noted that the AMR22 was a wide body, using the full width of the available floor. The sidepod radiators had a deep cut, and the AMR22 featured a double floor design.  The engine was mounted towards the back, as noted by the plenum blister, which suggested the AMR22 had a small gearbox. The AMR22 had cooling vents along the entirety of the upper sidepod, the front openings of which were small boxes compared to previous cars. The AMR22 was part of the official pre season test in Bahrain, where 339 laps were completed at a fastest time of 1.33.821 (Vettel). At the second test in Barcelona both Vettel and Stroll performed the testing duties again, and managed a combined total of 296 laps.

At the Spanish Grand Prix, the AMR22 was significantly updated and changed. It was similar in design to the Red Bull, which was investigated by the FIA who confirmed the upgrades were legitimate. In a later interview, Andrew Green confirmed that the team had been working on two differing designs for the AMR22 over a six month period. In June, driver Lance Stroll confirmed that there were further developments planned for the AMR22.

Racing performance
Prior to the opening round of the season, Sebastian Vettel was replaced for the race by Nico Hülkenberg due his contraction of Covid-19. At the first race, neither car finished in the points scoring positions. At the second round in Saudi Arabia, both cars finished the race but again, neither scored points. Vettel returned for the Australian Grand Prix, but retired from the race.

The AMR22 scored its first points at the Emilia Romagna Grand Prix with an 8th and 10th place finish.  Stroll scored 10th place and a single point at the Miami Grand Prix and his home race in Canada, whilst Vettel secured three points finishes at Monaco, Azerbaijan and Britain. To celebrate Aston Martin's 100 years in motor racing, the AMR22 featured the marque's historic badge on its nosecone for the French Grand Prix. In the race, Stroll scored the team's first point since Silverstone, after a close last lap battle with team mate Vettel. The team secured its second double points score at the Singapore Grand Prix, with Stroll in 6th and Vettel in 8th. Vettel and Stroll's 6th place finishes in Baku, Singapore and Japan are the AMR22's best results to date. Unfortunately, the team would finish in 7th place in the constructors' standings with Alfa Romeo finishing 6th on countback.

In late July, Vettel announced he would be retiring from Formula One at the end of the season. This means the AMR22 would be the final car driven competitively by the four time world champion.

Sponsorship
The AMR22 once again featured title sponsorship and branding from Cognizant.  Aramco and Crypto.com both joined the team as senior partners with branding across the vehicle, and Aramco joining the teams official name.

Complete Formula One results
(key)

References

External links 

 

Aston Martin AMR22
AMR22